The Mahra Sultanate, known in its later years as the Mahra State of Qishn and Socotra or sometimes the Mahra Sultanate of Ghayda and Socotra was a sultanate that included the historical region of Mahra and the Guardafui Channel island of Socotra in what is now eastern Yemen. It was ruled by the Banu Afrar dynasty for most of its history.

In 1886, the Sultanate became a British protectorate and later joined the Aden Protectorate. The Sultanate was abolished in 1967 upon the founding of the People's Republic of South Yemen and is now part of the Republic of Yemen.

The Sultanate was inhabited by the Mahri people who spoke the Mahri language, a modern South Arabian language. The Mehri share, with their regional neighbours on the island of Socotra and in Dhofar in Oman, blood lineage ties in Somalia with the Mehri in Somalia (Arab Salah)  tribe, cultural traditions like a modern South Arabian language, Arabic incursions, and frankincense agriculture. The region benefits from a coastal climate, distinct from the surrounding desert climate, with seasons dominated by the khareef or monsoon.

In 1967, with the departure of the British from the larger southern Arabian region, the Aden-based South Yemeni government divided the Mahra region, creating the Al Mahra Governorate. Socotra was administered by the Aden Governorate until 2004, when it was placed under the Hadhramaut Governorate. In 2013, however, Socotra was removed from the Hadramaut Governorate and created a governorate (Socotra Governorate) in its own right.

Ancient history
The ancient history of the Mahra region begins with the formation of the ʿĀd kingdom by an Arabian tribe called ʿĀd which settled in South Arabia. The Mehri people are traditionally considered descendants of the ʿĀd Kingdom and blood relatives of the Thamud. According to Islamic genealogies, the forefather of the Mehri people was Ya'rub, the son of Qahtan, grandson of the Prophet Hud, and ancestor of the Himyarite, Qataban and Sabaean kingdoms. Ya'rub (or, by alternate accounts, Ya'rub's son), is sometimes credited with the invention of the Arabic language.

During ancient times, the ʿĀd Kingdom was a transshipment point for the frankincense trade. It was exported mostly to ancient Europe. It has been suggested the ʿĀd Kingdom, and the current location of Mahra Sultanate, were the first places in the world where the camel was domesticated.

Islamic period
During the first decade of the Islamic calendar (the 620s in the Gregorian calendar), a large delegation from Mahra under the leadership of Mehri bin Abyad went to Medina to meet the Islamic prophet Muhammad, and during that meeting the entire Mehri tribe decided to embrace Islam. Before embracing Islam, the tribe was polytheist and worshiped multiple deities. After the meeting in Medina, Muhammad issued an injunction, stating that the members of the Mehri tribe are true Muslims and no war should be waged against them, and that any violator of the injunction shall be considered to be waging war against Allah.

The entire Mehri tribe became some of the earliest adopters of Islam. Their action had an added bonus as becoming Muslims secured them a political alliance and stable relations with the Muslim leadership in Medina. Prior to embracing Islam, Al-Mahra was a vassal state of the Persian Empire and had been subjected to Persian control for many years. Siding with Medina enabled the Mehri people to break away from Persian control and regain their liberty.

Ridda Wars

When Muhammad died in the year 632 CE, many Arab tribes, including the Mehri, interpreted his death as the end of Islam, and they abandoned the religion by either reverting to paganism or following certain individuals who claimed prophethood. In 634 CE, the Mehri and other tribes rebelled against Caliph Abu Bakar who became the new leader of the Muslims. In response, he launched a new military campaign against the rebels.

There were not many records about the power structure within the Mehris, however, during the Ridda Wars information regarding the intra-tribal affair was revealed by al-Tabari. According to al-Tabari, before the death of Prophet Muhammad, there was an intra-tribal rivalry within the Mehri tribe, which consisted of two competing factions: the Bani Shakhrah faction and their larger rival, the Bani Muharib. The Bani Muharib, who hailed from Al-Mahra's mountain regions, had the upper hand against their smaller rival.

A Muslim army under the command of Ikrimah ibn Abi Jahl was sent to Al-Mahra to face the Mehri who had turned their back on Islam like many Arab tribes. The Muslim army was too weak to confront the Mehri tribe in battle, and this situation forced Ikrimah to engage in political activity rather than initiating war in Mahra. Ikrimah met with the leadership of the Bani Muharib faction and convinced them to return to Islam. After this event, the army under Ikrimah's command, and the Bani Muharib faction, formed a military alliance against the Bani Shakhrah. The Ridda War in Al-Mahra ended quickly as the newly formed alliance subdued the Bani Shakhrah faction without bloodshed. Islam was once again the only religion in Al-Mahra.

The military legacy of al-Mahra 
The people of al-Mahra played a role in the history of Islam and the Arab world's military achievements during the early years of Islam. The Mehri army participated in the first Muslim conquest of the Maghreb. The Mehri tribe's achievements have been well-documented by historian Ibn 'Abd al-Hakam in his book titled The History of the Conquests of Egypt and North Africa and Spain.

At the beginning of the first Muslim conquest of the Maghreb, the Al-Mahri tribe mostly contributed cavalry to the army. They played a crucial role in the Arab army under the command of 'Amr ibn al-'As, who was a well-known Arab military commander and one of the Sahaba Companions. The Al-Mahri army fought alongside him during the Arab conquest of North Africa, which began with the defeat of the Byzantine imperial forces at the Battle of Heliopolis, and later at the Battle of Nikiou in Egypt in the year 646. The Mehri army were highly skilled cavalry which rode horses and a special camel breed called the Mehri originating from Al-Mahra which was renowned for its speed, agility and toughness. The Al-Mahra contingent even spearheaded the army during the conquest of the city of Alexandria.

The Al-Mahra army was nicknamed "the people who kill without being killed" by 'Amr ibn al-'As. Commander 'Amr ibn al-'As was amazed by Mehri army's ruthlessly fighting skill and efficient warfare.

As a result of Al-Mahri's success in the Muslim conquest of Egypt, its commander named Abd al-sallam ibn Habira al-Mahri was promoted and he was ordered by 'Amr ibn al-'As to lead the entire Muslim army during the Arab conquest of Libya which at the time was a Byzantine territory. The army under the command Abd al-sallam ibn Habira Al-Mahri defeated the Byzantine imperial army in Libya, and this campaign headed by Commander Al-Mahri brought a permanent end to Byzantine rule of Libya. After the Muslim conquest of Egypt, Abd al-sallam ibn Habira Al-Mahri was once again promoted as a result of his success as a temporary commander of the entire Muslim army, and subsequently he was appointed the first Muslim leader of Libya.

During the Second Fitna, more than 600 soldiers carrying the Al-Mahra flag were sent to North Africa to fight the Byzantines and Berbers.

Throughout the first Muslim conquest of the Maghreb the army from Al-Mahra were awarded lands in the newly conquered territories. Initially the Mehri tribe were awarded lands in the region of Jabal Yashkar by the Muslim leadership. This region was located east of the town of Al-Askar which at that time was the capital of Egypt. After the end of Muslim conquest of Egypt in year 641, the Muslim commander  'Amr ibn al-'As established the town of Fustat which became the new capital of Egypt, and the Mehri tribe were given additional land in Fustat which then became known as Khittat Mahra or the Mahra quarter in English. This land was used by the Mahra forces as a garrison. The Mahra quarter was named after the residents from Al-Mahra as they were the sole residents and owners of the land. Other Arab tribes which were part of the Muslim conquest of Egypt had to share lands which is the reason why their lands bore a non-tribal name. The Mahra tribe also shared the al-Raya quarter in Fustat with various tribes who were closely associated with the Prophet Muhammad and, according to historical accounts, the Mahra forces used the al-Raya quarter as a residence and stable for their precious horses. The Mahra quarter was located close to the Al-Raya quarter was which the absolute centre of the new capital of Fustat. Later, the Mahra neighbourhood was renamed and lost its historic name.

Several centuries later, another Mehri man called Abu Bekr Mohammed Ibn Ammar Al-Mahri Ash-shilbi, who was a politician from modern day Silves, Portugal, became a prime minister of the Taifa of Seville in Islamic Iberia, and served King Al-Mu'tamid ibn Abbad who was member of Muslim Dynasties of Spain. Abu Bekr was highly competent as prime minister, but later he crowned himself king of the annexed Taifa of Murcia and led a failed rebellion against the Mohammedan Dynasties of Spain. In year 1084, Abu Bekr Mohammed Ibn Ammar Al-Mahri Ash-shilbi was caught and executed by the forces of the Kingdom of Seville.

Mahra Sultanate 
After the erosion of Abbasid authority in Yemen, the tribes of al-Mahra had grown distant from Arabic rule. The Ayyubids of Egypt held loose authority over the region, followed by the Rasulids of western Yemen.

Sultanate of Shihr 
In 1432, the Ba Dujana family took control of the important coastal city of Shihr from the Rasulids, and then successfully repelled a Rasulid counterattack. In 1445, the Ba Dujana defended against an attack by the newly formed Kathiri state, securing their borders. The independent sultanate at Shihr was the first premodern state in Mahri lands.

Following the collapse of the Rasulid dynasty and the rise of the Tahirids, a number of former dignitaries from Aden came to Shihr as refugees, and told the reigning sultan, Muhammad bin Sa'd, that Aden was ripe for conquest. In 1456, Muhammad bin Sa'd launched a naval invasion of Aden with nine ships; however, much of the fleet was broken up in a storm and bin Sa'd was captured by the Tahirids. In retaliation, the Tahirid sultan sent an army commanded by Zayn al-Sunbuli to occupy Shihr. The campaign was only half-successful, and parts of the area were still held by the Ba Dujana. Determined to break the stalemate, Sultan Malik Amir bin Tahir led a great expedition across the desert coast from Aden to Mahra. Vastly outnumbered, the Ba Dujana retreated from Shihr ahead of the Tahirid advance. The Tahirids plundered the city and installed a governor who was loyal to their interests.

The city of Shihr was once more brought under the control of the Ba Dujana clan in 1478, when it was taken by their young leader, Sa'd bin Faris. Around 1480, the Mahri settled the island of Socotra and used it as a strategic base against their rivals in Hadhramaut. During this time, al-Mahra had been in a near-constant state of war with the Kathiri, who were trying to take control of Shihr. In 1488, the Ba Dujana enlisted the help of their Socotran allies to push the Kathiri out of Shihr once more.

Sultanate of Qishn and Socotra 
Yet the dominance of the Ba Dujana clan would last only for another seven years. In 1495, bouts of infighting between the tribes of Mahra escalated into civil war. The Kathiri sultan, Jafar bin 'Amr, took advantage of the situation to support the Zwedi faction, ensuring the downfall of the Ba Dujana hegemony. After a disastrous defeat at Tabala, on the outskirts of Shihr, the Ba Dujana permanently lost control of the city and were isolated in the interior. They were replaced by the Zwedi and Afrari families of Qishn and Socotra, who, in sacrificing Shihr to the Kathiri state, managed to solidify the core Mahra domain as it would remain, more or less, until the present day.

Arrival of the Portuguese 
In 1507, a Portuguese fleet commanded by Tristão da Cunha and Afonso de Albuquerque landed on Socotra and, after a bloody battle, seized the main fortress at Suq. Socotra would remain in Portuguese hands until 1511, and was abandoned by the Portuguese due to its poor strategic importance to control the Red Sea.

In 1545, the Kathiri sultan Badr bin Tuwayriq amassed an army and, with support from the Ottoman Turks, conquered Qishn. The Portuguese, who were competing with the Ottomans for control of trade routes in the Red Sea and Indian Ocean, bombarded Qishn and returned it to the Mahris.

British protectorate

The connection of the British Government with Mahra commenced in 1834, when Captain Ross, of the Indian Navy, was sent on a mission to Mahra, and concluded an agreement with Sultan Ahmed bin Sultan of Fartash and his cousin, Sultan bin Amr of Qishn, by which they consented to the landing and storage of coal on the island by the British Government.

In 1835 negotiations were undertaken through Commander Haines with the Sultan, Amr bin Saad Tawari, for the purchase of the island, and in anticipation of their success a detachment of European and Indian troops was sent to take possession. The Sultan, however, refused to sell the island, or even to cede a portion of it as a coaling depot, and the troops were withdrawn. In 1838 the Chief proposed to farm the island to the British Government, but the capture of Aden, while the proposal was under discussion, rendered it unnecessary to secure Socotra as a coaling station.

Sultan Amr bin Saad Tawari died about 1845, and was succeeded in the Sultanate of Socotra and Qishn by his nephew, Tawari bin Ali, who in turn was succeeded by his grandson, Ahmed bin Saad. The latter was succeeded by his nephew, Abdulla bin Saad, who was followed by his cousin, Abdulla bin Salim. On the death of the latter he was succeeded by his son, Ali.

In January 1876 an agreement was concluded with the Sultan of Socotra and Qishn, by which, in consideration of a payment of 3,000 dollars and an annual subsidy of 360 dollars, he bound himself, his heirs and successors, never to cede, sell, mortgage, or otherwise give for occupation, save to the British Government, the island of Socotra or any of its dependencies, the neighbouring islands.

In 1886 he accepted a Protectorate Treaty, and bound himself to abstain from all dealings with foreign powers without the previous sanction of the British Government. At the same time he undertook to give immediate notice to the Resident at Aden or other British officer of any attempt by any other power to interfere with Socotra and its dependencies. In 1888 a similar Protectorate Treaty was concluded with Sultan Ali bin Abdulla, as head of the Mahri tribe, and his annual stipend was increased by 120 dollars. In 1898 some of the cargo of the P. and O. S. S. Aden wrecked off Socotra was plundered, and the Sultan was reminded of his obligations under the Agreement of 1876.

Sultan Ali bin Abdulla had three sons, all of whom predeceased him. He died in 1907 and was succeeded by Sultan Abdulla bin Isa, to whom was continued the annual stipend paid to his predecessor. The Sultan of Socotra and Qishn receives a salute of 9 guns, which was made permanent in 1902.

In the 1940s Al-Mahra and its neighbouring regions along the Gulf were forced to sign Advisory Treaties, and those who refused were subjected to deadly airstrikes delivered by the British Royal Air force. The Advisory Treaty meant that the local leadership no longer had jurisdiction over their internal affairs, and the treaty gave the British government complete control over the nation's internal affairs and the order of succession. The Advisory Treaties caused resentment against British rule and the spread of Arab Nationalism in Al-Mahra and the rest of the Arabian Peninsula.

The end of the Mahra Sultanate

During the 1960s the British sustained losses against various Egypt-sponsored guerrilla forces and the Front for the Liberation of Occupied South Yemen (FLOSY). In 1963 the British government declared a state of emergency in the Aden Protectorate, and by 1967 the British forces had left Yemen as a result of losses against the National Liberation Front (Yemen) which later seized power in Al-Mahra. In 1967, the Al-Mahra sultanate was absorbed by the Marxist People's Republic of South Yemen which itself was an entity heavily sponsored by the Soviets. They put an end to the centuries-old Al-Mahri sultanate. Sultan Issa Bin Ali Al-Afrar Al-Mahri was the last reigning Al-Mahri Sultan of Qishn and Socotra.

The sultanate was abolished in 1967 and was annexed by Soviet supported South Yemen, which itself later united with North Yemen to become unified Yemen in 1990. In 2014 the land which was formerly known as the Mahra Sultanate of Qishn and Socotra was absorbed into a new region called Hadramaut, and this reform has angered many in Al-Mahra who now believe that the Yemeni government is further centralizing its grip on power.

Rulers
The Sultans of Mahra had the title of Sultan al-Dawla al-Mahriyya (Sultan Qishn wa Suqutra). Their descendants are active politicians nowadays. The Al-Mahra Sultanate was consistently ruled by the Al-Mahri dynasty from year 1750 till 1967.

Sultans
c.1750 - 1780: `Afrar al-Mahri
c.1780 - 1800: Taw`ari ibn `Afrar al-Mahri
c.1800 - 1820: Sa`d ibn Taw`ari Ibn `Afrar al-Mahri
c.1834: Sultan ibn `Amr (on Suqutra)
c.1834: Ahmad ibn Sultan (at Qishn)
1835 - 1845: `Amr ibn Sa`d ibn Taw`ari Afrar al-Mahri
1845 - 18.. Taw`ari ibn `Ali Afrar al-Mahri 
18.. - 18.. Ahmad ibn Sa`d Afrar al-Mahri 
18.. - 18.. `Abd Allah ibn Sa`d Afrar al-Mahri 
18.. - 18.. `Abd Allah ibn Salim Afrar al-Mahri 
1875? - 1907: `Ali ibn `Abd Allah Afrar al-Mahri
1907 - 1928?: `Abd Allah ibn `Isa Afrar al-Mahri
1946? - Feb 1952: Ahmad ibn `Abd Allah Afrar al-Mahri
Feb 1952 - 1967: `Isa ibn `Ali ibn Salim Afrar al-Mahri

Mehri camels 
Al-Mahra is home to the Mehri camel, which has been an integral part of Al-Mahra army's military success during the Islamic conquests of Egypt and North Africa against the Byzantine Empire. During the conquests the cavalry unit from Al-Mahra introduced the Mehri camel to northern Africa, and now it is found throughout the area. It is better known as the Mehari camel in most of northern Africa, and is sometimes also known as the Sahel camel.

It is a special breed originating in Al-Mahra. They are renowned for their speed, agility and toughness. They have a large but slender physique, and because of its small hump it is perfectly suited for riding.

During the colonial period in northern Africa, the French government took advantage of the Mehri camel's proven military capabilities, and established a camel corps called the Méhariste which was part of the Armée d'Afrique. It patrolled the Sahara using the Mehri camel. The French Méhariste camel corps was part of the Compagnies Sahariennes the French Army of the Levant.

In 1968, France's car maker Citroën introduced the Citroën Méhari, which was a light off-road vehicle named after the famous Mehri camel. The Citroën Méhari was a variant of the Citroën 2CV, and Citroën built more than 144,000 Méhari between 1968 and 1988. A new, 2016 electric model called the Citroën E-Méhari is now being sold in Europe; it is a compact SUV like the Méhari.

See also
Aden Protectorate

References

External links
Mahra State flag
Postage stamps
Map of Arabia (1905-1923) including the states of Aden Protectorate

States and territories established in 1432
States and territories disestablished in 1967
History of Yemen
Former countries in the Middle East
Sultanates
Protectorate of South Arabia
Former countries
1967 disestablishments in Asia
1430s establishments in Asia
Former sultanates
Socotra